Garcia Live Volume 13 is a two-CD live album by the Jerry Garcia Band.  It was recorded on September 16, 1989 at Poplar Creek Music Theatre in Hoffman Estates, Illinois.  It was released on April 24, 2020.

At this concert Clarence Clemons of Bruce Springsteen's E Street Band played saxophone for the entire show.

September 1989 tour 
In September 1989 the Jerry Garcia Band played a 12-concert tour of the Northeast and Midwest.  Garcia Live Volume 13 is a recording of the last show of this tour.  At five of the concerts, including this one, Clarence Clemons sat in on tenor saxophone.  The opening act at all the shows was Bob Weir and Rob Wasserman.

Critical reception 
In Glide Magazine, Doug Collette wrote, "Everyone involved is deeply engaged, energetic and enthusiastic, so the playing transcends the ostensible familiarity of this setlist. And, as essayist Blair Jackson also points out in [the album liner notes], Clemons' pedigreed playing moves Garcia to stretch himself, not just through his impassioned guitar or his singing... but quite probably in song choice as well."

Track listing 
Disc 1
First set:
 "Cats Under the Stars" (Jerry Garcia, Robert Hunter) – 9:32
 "They Love Each Other" (Garcia, Hunter) – 8:26
 "Let It Rock" (Chuck Berry) – 9:00
 "I Shall Be Released" (Bob Dylan) – 9:54
 "Someday Baby" (Lightnin' Hopkins) – 8:17
 "Dear Prudence" (John Lennon, Paul McCartney) – 11:06
 "Let's Spend the Night Together" (Mick Jagger, Keith Richards) – 10:40

Disc 2
Second set:
 "How Sweet It Is (To Be Loved by You)" (Brian Holland, Lamont Dozier, Eddie Holland) – 7:56
 "Knockin' on Heaven's Door" (Dylan) – 11:45
 "Think" (Jimmy McCracklin, Deadric Malone) – 9:45
 "Waiting for a Miracle" (Bruce Cockburn) – 7:03
 "Evangeline" (David Hidalgo, Louie Pérez) – 5:51
 "The Night They Drove Old Dixie Down" (Robbie Robertson) – 10:34
 "Tangled Up in Blue" (Dylan) – 12:22

Personnel
Jerry Garcia Band
 Jerry Garcia – guitar, vocals
 Melvin Seals – keyboards
 John Kahn – bass
 David Kemper – drums
 Jaclyn LaBranch – vocals
 Gloria Jones – vocals
Additional musicians
 Clarence Clemons – saxophone
Production
 Produced by Marc Allan, Kevin Monty
 Project Coordination by Lauren Goetzinger
 Recording: John Cutler
 Mastering: Fred Kevorkian
 Design, illustration: Ryan Corey
 Liner notes essay: Blair Jackson
 Photos: Bob Minkin

References 

Jerry Garcia Band live albums
2020 live albums
ATO Records live albums